Transmembrane protein 131 (TMEM131) is a protein that is encoded by the TMEM131 gene in humans.  The TMEM131 protein contains three domains of unknown function 3651 (DUF3651)  and two transmembrane domains.  This protein has been implicated as having a role in T cell function and development. TMEM131 also resides in a locus (2q11.1) that is associated with Nievergelt's Syndrome when deleted.

Role In T Cell Function
TMEM131 has been shown to exhibit hypermethylation in patients with Down Syndrome. The authors of this study proposed that, given TMEM131s supposed function in T cell development and function, this hypermethylation may play a role in the suppressed immune function in patients with Down Syndrome.

TMEM131 has also been shown to be up-regulated during the development and differentiation of T cells, and has been shown to have relatively high levels of expression in T cells relative to other tissue types.

Gene

Overview

TMEM131 is located on the negative DNA strand (see Sense) of chromosome 2 from 98,372,799 - 98,612,354. The gene product is a 6,657 base pair mRNA with 41 predicted exons in the human gene. Ensembl predicts ten alternative splice forms, four of which are protein coding. 
Promoter prediction and analysis was carried out using El Dorado through the Genomatix software page. The predicted promoter region spans 1002 base pairs from 98,611,892 through 98,612,893 on the minus strand of chromosome 2. The program predicted two potential transcriptional start locations. The first spans 216 base pairs from 98,612,501 through 98,612,716. The second spans 182 base pairs from 98,612,262 through 98,612,443.

Gene Neighborhood 
TMEM131 is located directly adjacent to the ZAP70 gene (98,330,331 - 98,356,323) on the positive DNA strand, as well as numerous pseudogenes at the 2q11.2 locus. A Von Willebrand factor containing gene (VWA3B) is located upstream from TMEM131 on the positive strand (98,703,595 - 98,929,410).

Gene Expression 

TMEM131 is expressed in low to moderate levels throughout most of the body, with slightly increased levels occurring in the lymph nodes, uterus and T cells. Expression data in developing fruit fly embryos is available from the BDGP in situ homepage.

Protein

Properties/Characteristics

The primary function of the TMEM131 protein is not well understood. The human form has 1883 amino acid residues, with an isoelectric point of 8.74 and a molecular mass of 205,100 Daltons. It has been shown to contain two transmembrane domains at residues 1,091-1,111 and 1,118-1,138.  Three DUF3651 regions are located on the N-terminal side of the two adjacent transmembrane domains. These are located at residues 173-245, 502-582, and 639-708. The intercellular location of the protein has not been experimentally determined, but it is thought to reside in either the plasma membrane or endoplasmic reticulum, with each domain on both the N-terminal and C-terminal sides of the transmembrane regions being cytosolic.  It contains numerous phosphorylation sites which have been shown both experimentally and with bioinformatic tools. Bioinformatic analysis of the protein using the NetPhos tool  predicted 145 potential phosphorylation sites throughout the entire length of the protein.

Protein Interactions 
Protein interaction analysis for TMEM131 has been carried out using computational tools. No interactions were identified through the MINT database. A STRING search revealed ten possible protein interactions through text mining, although none of these should be considered actual protein-protein interactions.  Closer analysis of the results shows very little potential for these predictions to be real. The IntAct tool was also used, and this revealed a potential interaction had been found with Superoxide dismutase 2 (SOD2), which had been identified in a yeast Two-hybrid screening study.

Conservation

Orthologs
TMEM131 is conserved throughout all of its orthologs. The entire protein is highly conserved in primate orthologs, while conservation is high within the DUF3651 and transmembrane regions in the more distant homologs.

Orthologs were found in species as distantly related to Humans as the Choanoflagellate Monosiga brevicollis using BLAST and the ALIGN tool through the San Diego Super Computer Biology Workbench. The following table gives information on the homologs of TMEM131.

Paralog
TMEM131 has a single paralog, TMEM131L or KIAA0922. This gene is very similar to TMEM131, but it does not include the second two of the three DUF3651 regions.

References